Ciara Marie McCormack (born 29 September 1979) is a soccer defender who plays for Treaty United. She has made eight appearances for the Republic of Ireland women's national football team.

College career
McCormack won a scholarship to Yale University and played college soccer for four years. She spent a further year at the University of Connecticut.

Club career
McCormack has featured for Boston Renegades, Vancouver Whitecaps Women and Ottawa Fury Women in the W-League. She also played for Fortuna Hjørring in Denmark. Since moving to Norway in 2008, McCormack represented Toppserien clubs Asker Fotball, FK Larvik and Kolbotn Fotball. She left Kolbotn for Donn Toppfotball in August 2010.

In January 2023, McCormack joined Irish club Treaty United.

International career
In late 2007 McCormack delayed her arrival in Norway to attend a training camp with the Canada women's national soccer team.

However, McCormack first appeared for the Republic of Ireland in three friendly games against the United States in September 2008. She then played in both defence and midfield for Ireland. McCormack's father Barry is from Athlone and her mother is from County Cork.

She won the last of her eight caps in a defeat by the Netherlands in August 2010. On 5 May 2014, Ireland manager Susan Ronan recalled McCormack to an experimental squad for a friendly against the Basque Country. McCormack started Ireland's 2–0 defeat in Azpeitia, which was not classified as a full international fixture.

References

External links

Ciara McCormack at Football Association of Ireland (FAI)

1979 births
Living people
Republic of Ireland women's association footballers
Republic of Ireland women's international footballers
Expatriate women's footballers in Norway
Expatriate women's footballers in Denmark
Canadian people of Irish descent
Fortuna Hjørring players
Vancouver Whitecaps FC (women) players
USL W-League (1995–2015) players
Newcastle Jets FC (A-League Women) players
Sportspeople from North Vancouver
Yale Bulldogs women's soccer players
University of Connecticut alumni
Irish expatriate sportspeople in Norway
Toppserien players
Canadian women's soccer players
UConn Huskies women's soccer players
Expatriate women's soccer players in Australia
Irish expatriate sportspeople in Australia
Women's association football defenders
Ottawa Fury (women) players
Boston Renegades players